Alessandro Da Col (born 11 March 1978) is a retired Italian tennis player.

Da Col has a career-high ATP singles ranking of 396, achieved on 14 August 2006. He also has a career-high doubles ranking of 213, achieved on 27 August 2007.

He won two doubles titles at the ATP Challenger Tour.

ATP Challenger and ITF Futures finals

Singles: 6 (4–2)

Doubles: 42 (17–25)

References

External links
 
 

1978 births
Living people
Italian male tennis players